In organic chemistry, an amide, also known as an organic amide or a carboxamide, is a compound with the general formula , where R, R', and R″ represent any group, typically organyl groups or hydrogen atoms. The amide group is called a peptide bond when it is part of the main chain of a protein, and an isopeptide bond when it occurs in a side chain, such as in the amino acids asparagine and glutamine. It can be viewed as a derivative of a carboxylic acid with the hydroxyl group replaced by an amine group; or, equivalently, an acyl (alkanoyl) group joined to an amine group.

Common examples of amides are formamide, acetamide, benzamide, and dimethylformamide. Some uncommon examples of amides are N-chloroacetamide and chloroformamide.

The core  of amides is called the amide group (specifically, carboxamide group).

Amides are pervasive in nature and technology. Proteins and important plastics like Nylons, Aramid, Twaron, and Kevlar are polymers whose units are connected by amide groups (polyamides); these linkages are easily formed, confer structural rigidity, and resist hydrolysis. Amides include many other important biological compounds, as well as many drugs like paracetamol, penicillin and LSD. Low-molecular-weight amides, such as dimethylformamide, are common solvents.

Nomenclature

In the usual nomenclature, one adds the term "amide" to the stem of the parent acid's name. For instance, the amide derived from acetic acid is named acetamide (CH3CONH2). IUPAC recommends ethanamide, but this and related formal names are rarely encountered. When the amide is derived from a primary or secondary amine, the substituents on nitrogen are indicated first in the name. Thus, the amide formed from dimethylamine and acetic acid is N,N-dimethylacetamide (CH3CONMe2, where Me = CH3). Usually even this name is simplified to dimethylacetamide. Cyclic amides are called lactams; they are necessarily secondary or tertiary amides.

Applications

Amides are prevalent throughout the natural and engineered world. Most biological macromolecules consist of peptides linked together through amide bonds; some man-made polymers adopt the same strategy.

Properties

Bonding

The lone pair of electrons on the nitrogen atom is delocalized into the carbonyl group, thus forming a partial double bond between nitrogen and carbon. In fact the O, C and N atoms have molecular orbitals occupied by delocalized electrons, forming a conjugated system. Consequently, the three bonds of the nitrogen in amides is not pyramidal (as in the amines) but planar. This planar restriction prevents rotations about the N linkage and thus has important consequences for the mechanical properties of bulk material of such molecules, and also for the configurational properties of macromolecules built by such bonds. The inability to rotate distinguishes amide groups from ester groups which allow rotation and thus create more flexible bulk material.

The structure of an amide can be described also as a resonance between two alternative structures: neutral (A) and zwitterionic (B).

It is estimated that for acetamide, structure A makes a 62% contribution to the structure, while structure B makes a 28% contribution. (These figures do not sum to 100% because there are additional less-important resonance forms that are not depicted above). There is also a hydrogen bond present between the active groups hydrogen and nitrogen atoms. Resonance is largely prevented in the very strained quinuclidone.

Basicity
Compared to amines, amides are very weak bases. While the conjugate acid of an amine has a pKa of about 9.5, the conjugate acid of an amide has a pKa around −0.5. Therefore, amides don't have as clearly noticeable acid–base properties in water. This relative lack of basicity is explained by the withdrawing of electrons from the amine by the carbonyl. On the other hand, amides are much stronger bases than carboxylic acids, esters, aldehydes, and ketones (their conjugate acids' pKas are between −6 and −10).

The proton of a primary or secondary amide does not dissociate readily under normal conditions; its pKa is usually well above 15. Conversely, under extremely acidic conditions, the carbonyl oxygen can become protonated with a pKa of roughly −1. It is not only because of the positive charge on the nitrogen, but also because of the negative charge on the oxygen gained through resonance.

Hydrogen bonding and solubility
Because of the greater electronegativity of oxygen, the carbonyl (C=O) is a stronger dipole than the N–C dipole. The presence of a C=O dipole and, to a lesser extent a N–C dipole, allows amides to act as H-bond acceptors. In primary and secondary amides, the presence of N–H dipoles allows amides to function as H-bond donors as well. Thus amides can participate in hydrogen bonding with water and other protic solvents; the oxygen atom can accept hydrogen bonds from water and the N–H hydrogen atoms can donate H-bonds. As a result of interactions such as these, the water solubility of amides is greater than that of corresponding hydrocarbons. These hydrogen bonds are also have an important role in the secondary structure of proteins.

The solubilities of amides and esters are roughly comparable. Typically amides are less soluble than comparable amines and carboxylic acids since these compounds can both donate and accept hydrogen bonds. Tertiary amides, with the important exception of N,N-dimethylformamide, exhibit low solubility in water.

Characterization
The presence of the amide group  is generally easily established, at least in small molecules. It can be distinguished from nitro and cyano groups in IR spectra. Amides exhibit a moderately intense νCO band near 1650 cm−1. By 1H NMR spectroscopy, CONHR signals occur at low fields. In X-ray crystallography, the  center together with the three immediately adjacent atoms linked to C and N characteristically define a plane.

Reactions 

Amides undergo many chemical reactions, although they are less reactive than esters. Amides hydrolyse in hot alkali as well as in strong acidic conditions. Acidic conditions yield the carboxylic acid and the ammonium ion while basic hydrolysis yield the carboxylate ion and ammonia. The protonation of the initially generated amine under acidic conditions and the deprotonation of the initially generated carboxylic acid under basic conditions render these processes non-catalytic and irreversible. Amides are also versatile precursors to many other functional groups. Electrophiles react with the carbonyl oxygen. This step often precedes hydrolysis, which is catalyzed by both Brønsted acids and Lewis acids. Enzymes, e.g. peptidases and artificial catalysts, are known to accelerate the hydrolysis reactions.

Synthesis

Many methods exist in amide synthesis.

Amides can be prepared by coupling carboxylic acid with an amine. The direct reaction generally requires high temperatures to drive off the water:

Many methods involve "activating" the carboxylic acid by converting it to a better electrophile; such as esters, acid chlorides (Schotten-Baumann reaction), or anhydrides (Lumière–Barbier method).

Conventional methods in peptide synthesis use coupling agents such as HATU, HOBt, or PyBOP.

A variety of reagents, e.g. tris(2,2,2-trifluoroethyl) borate have been developed for specialized applications.

Other methods
Dehydrogenative acylation of amines is catalyzed by organoruthenium compounds:

The reaction proceed by one dehydrogenation of the alcohol to the aldehyde followed by formation of a hemiaminal, which undergoes a second dehydrogenation to the amide. Elimination of water in the hemiaminal to the imine is not observed.

Transamidation is typically very slow, but it is accelerated with Lewis acid and organometallic catalysts:

Primary amides are more amenable to this reaction.

See also
 Amidogen
 Amino radical
 Amidicity
 Metal amides

References

External links

IUPAC Compendium of Chemical Terminology

 
Functional groups